The Serie B 1986–87 was the fifty-fifth tournament of this competition played in Italy since its creation.

Teams
Parma, Modena, Messina and Taranto had been promoted from Serie C, while Pisa, Bari and Lecce had been relegated from Serie A.

Events
Tiebreakers were restored in relegation zone.

Final classification

Results

Tie-breakers

Promotion tie-breaker

Played in San Benedetto del Tronto on July 8

Cesena promoted to Serie A.

Relegation tie-breaker

Campobasso relegated to Serie C1.

References and sources
Almanacco Illustrato del Calcio - La Storia 1898-2004, Panini Edizioni, Modena, September 2005

Footnotes

Serie B seasons
2
Italy